Lawrence Brooks de Graaf (born August 30, 1932 in Yonkers, New York) is an American historian. He is a professor emeritus of History at California State University, Fullerton, where he is the namesake of the Lawrence de Graaf Center for Oral and Public History.

De Graaf was the oldest son of Kathryn née Brooks and Jacob C. de Graaf, a salesman whose parents had immigrated from Rotterdam in 1909. He grew up in various places in New York State before moving in 1944 to Glendale, California, where his father had taken a job with Sun Oil. De Graaf received a Bachelor's degree in History from Occidental College in Los Angeles in 1954 and both an M.A. and PhD in History from UCLA, the latter in 1962 with the dissertation Negro migration to Los Angeles, 1930 to 1950. In February 1959 he married Shirley Ferguson, with whom he would raise a daughter. In the fall of 1959, he was hired among the first faculty of the new Orange County State College (to be renamed California State University, Fullerton). De Graaf remained at Fullerton his whole career, retiring in 2002.

In 2006, the Los Angeles City Historical Society honored de Graaf with its Miriam Matthews Ethnic History Award for chronicling Southern California’s ethnic history.
In 2014, he was inducted into the International Youth-on-the-Move International Educators’ Hall of Fame Awards at Chapman University.

Works

References

1932 births
Living people
20th-century American historians
American male non-fiction writers
American demographers
California State University, Fullerton faculty
Historians from California
Historians of race relations
Occidental College alumni
University of California, Los Angeles alumni
American people of Dutch descent
People from Yonkers, New York
Historians from New York (state)
20th-century American male writers